Svrljig is a town and municipality located in the Nišava District of the southern Serbia. According to 2011 census, the town has a population of 7,553 inhabitants, while the municipality has 14,249.

Geography
Svrljig is situated on the river Svrljiški Timok, 30 km east from Niš, the third largest city in Serbia. Nearby villages include Crnoljevica and Prekonoga.

Settlements
Aside from the town of Svrljig, the municipality includes the following settlements:

 Beloinje
 Bučum
 Burdimo 
 Crnoljevica 
 Davidovac 
 Drajinac 
 Đurinac
 Galibabinac
 Gojmanovac 
 Grbavče 
 Gulijan 
 Guševac
 Izvor 
 Kopajkošara
 Labukovo 
 Lalinac 
 Lozan
 Lukovo
 Manojlica 
 Mečji Do 
 Merdželat 
 Niševac 
 Okolište 
 Okruglica 
 Palilula
 Periš 
 Pirkovac 
 Plužina 
 Popšica 
 Prekonoga 
 Radmirovac 
 Ribare 
 Slivje 
 Šljivovik 
 Tijovac 
 Varoš
 Vlahovo
 Željevo

History

Anthropology
An anthropological study by Mihailo Kostić claimed that the Svrljig province was inhabited by mostly an "olden" population, while part descends from "colonists from the second half of the 15th century". According to Petar Vlahović, Svrljig is part of the Serbian Šopi ethnographical region.

Middle Ages
Svrljig was the name of a župa (county) in the Middle Ages. It is mentioned (for the first time) in the geographical list of counties and cities in the 1019–20 charters of Byzantine Emperor Basil II. The settlement and its surrounding region is mentioned as part of the Eparchy of Niš. In 1183, Svrljig and other nearby fortifications were taken over by Serbian Grand Prince Stefan Nemanja. The fortification mostly dates to the medieval Serbian period. It was situated on the road which connected Niš with the road to Constantinople. An evangelion manuscript written in Svrljig in the Serbian redaction of Old Slavic dating to 1279 is preserved in fragments. After the fall of Braničevo under the Serbian king Stefan Milutin in 1290s Svrljig became a border region. Svrljig was conquered and plundered in 1413 by Ottoman prince Musa Çelebi. It was then part of Stefan Lazarević's Serbian Despotate.

Early modern period
The town was known as Isferlik and Isfirlig in Ottoman Turkish. It was administratively part of the Sanjak of Vidin.

Modern
During the Toplica Uprising (1917), Serbian guerrilla bands were active in the region.

In 1922, the Niš–Svrljig–Knjaževac–Zaječar highway was built. From 1929 to 1941, Svrljig was part of the Morava Banovina of the Kingdom of Yugoslavia. During World War II, Yugoslav Partisans were active in the region.

Demographics

According to the 2011 census results, the municipality of Svrljig has 14,249 inhabitants.

Ethnic groups
The ethnic composition of the municipality is:

Economy
The following table gives a preview of total number of employed people per their core activity (as of 2017):

See also
 Nišava District
 Subdivisions of Serbia

References

External links 

 

 
Populated places in Nišava District
Municipalities and cities of Southern and Eastern Serbia